Camp Township may refer to:

Camp Township, Polk County, Iowa
Camp Township, Renville County, Minnesota

See also
Camp Creek Township, Pike County, Ohio